The Tennessee College of Applied Technology -  at Pulaski is one of 46 institutions in the Tennessee Board of Regents System, the seventh-largest system of higher education in the nation. This system comprises six universities, thirteen community colleges, and 27 Colleges of Applied Technology. More than 80 percent of all Tennessee students attending public institutions are enrolled in a Tennessee Board of Regents institution.

Office the Tennessee Colleges of Applied Technology
The headquarters of the TCATs is in Nashville. James King is the Vice Chancellor for the Colleges of Applied Technology.

Academic programs
Each of the Tennessee Colleges of Applied Technology offers programs based on geographic needs of businesses and industry.  Therefore, each college can have different academic programs and offerings. The Tennessee College of Applied Technology - Pulaski offers certificates and diplomas in the following programs:

Advanced Manufacturing Education
Business Systems Technology
Computer Applications
Computer Operating Systems & Network Technology
Health Sciences
Heating, Ventilation, Air Conditioning & Refrigeration
Industrial Electricity
Industrial Maintenance Technology
Industrial Welding Technology
Residential/Commercial Wiring & Plumbing
Solar Photovoltaic Technology

See also
 List of colleges and universities in Tennessee

References

External links
 Tennessee College of Applied Technology - Pulaski
 Colleges of Applied Technology Profile
 Tennessee College of Applied Technology - Pulaski
 TBR Tennessee Colleges of Applied Technology Profile
 Tennessee Board of Regents
 Regents Online Degree Program
 Online Programs for TCATS

Education in Tennessee
Education in Giles County, Tennessee
Buildings and structures in Giles County, Tennessee
Public universities and colleges in Tennessee